The Lamoriello Trophy is awarded annually to the champion of the Hockey East Men's Ice Hockey Tournament. The award came into existence on March 7, 1988 and is named for the first commissioner of Hockey East, Lou Lamoriello, who as of 2022 is the general manager for the New York Islanders of the National Hockey League. In 1998, a permanent trophy was commissioned, and in 1999, it was awarded for the first time, to the Boston College Eagles. The winner of the Lamoriello Trophy receives an automatic entry to the NCAA Division I Ice Hockey Tournament. 

The 2020 tournament was cancelled due to the COVID-19 pandemic, therefore, the Lamoriello trophy was not awarded that year.

Winners

List of Hockey East Men's Ice Hockey Tournament champions

References
General

Specific

External links
Lamoriello Trophy

Hockey East Men's Ice Hockey Tournament
College ice hockey trophies and awards in the United States